Paul Batchelor (born 1977) is a British poet.

He was educated at the University of East Anglia (MA Creative Writing, 2000), and completed his PhD at Newcastle University. In 2003 he received an Eric Gregory Award from the Society of Authors.

His publications include 'The Sinking Road' (Bloodaxe Books, 2008), 'The Love Darg' (Clutag, 2014), and 'The Acts of Oblivion' (Carcanet, 2021). Batchelor lectures at Durham University.

Awards
2003 Eric Gregory Award

References

1977 births
Living people
Alumni of the University of East Anglia
Alumni of Newcastle University
21st-century British poets
21st-century British male writers
British male poets
Academics of Durham University